"I Admit" is a 19-minute song by American singer R. Kelly. Released on SoundCloud on July 23, 2018, the song addresses the singer's sexual abuse scandals. "I Admit" was written by Kelly and Raphael Ramos Oliveira, and produced by Kelly and Noc. The release of "I Admit" followed a 2017 BuzzFeed News investigative report that alleged that Kelly operated a "sex cult", and a 2018 boycott of Kelly backed by Time's Up. In "I Admit", Kelly makes a number of confessions, including that he is dyslexic, that he has been sexually unfaithful, and that he was raped. Kelly does not make any criminal admissions, but instead denies allegations of domestic violence and pedophilia. The lyrics rebuke Jim DeRogatis for his BuzzFeed News report, and disavow the report's allegations that Kelly is in charge of a "sex cult".

Critics reviewed "I Admit" unfavorably. Some reviewers contrasted the title with the lack of criminal admissions in the lyrics, and described the song as an act of trolling. The song was compared to Kelly's rap opera Trapped in the Closet and O. J. Simpson's book If I Did It, which addressed Simpson’s allegations of murder. Reviewers noted that Kelly's lyrics more closely resemble a self-defense than an admission or mea culpa. The release of "I Admit" led to a response from DeRogatis, who defended his journalism in two interviews. R. Kelly's ex-wife, Andrea Kelly, and brother, Carey Killa Kelly, released songs in response to "I Admit" that contain additional allegations against R. Kelly. The song also attracted criticism on social media.

Background and release 

"I Admit" is Kelly's first release since his 2016 holiday album, 12 Nights of Christmas.

In July 2017, Jim DeRogatis contributed an article to BuzzFeed News detailing legal investigations from three families regarding their daughters' alleged kidnappings after they established relationships with Kelly. The article characterized Kelly's operations as a "cult", and included interviews with three of Kelly's former associates. However, both Kelly and the daughters refuted the claims.

In April 2018, the Women of Color branch of the Time's Up movement announced their support for the Mute R. Kelly social media campaign, which advocated for music venues to cancel Kelly's concert dates and for Sony Music to terminate Kelly's recording contract. The organization published a demand on The Root for RCA Records, Ticketmaster, Spotify, Apple Music, and the Greensboro Coliseum Complex to end their business relationships with Kelly. Spotify removed Kelly's music from their playlists after introducing a "hate content and hateful conduct" policy in May 2018, but rescinded the policy in June 2018 after people in the music industry, including Kendrick Lamar's representative, accused the company of censorship.

"I Admit" was released on the SoundCloud account of Julius Darrington, CEO of the AudioDream record label, on July 23, 2018. RCA Records, Kelly's primary label, did not confirm whether they were associated with the song. Kelly promoted the release with a post, "Today is the day you've been waiting for", across Facebook, Twitter, and Instagram.

After the January 2019 broadcast of Surviving R. Kelly, Kelly appeared in a CBS This Morning interview on March 8, 2019, in which Gayle King asked him whether "I Admit" was his "way of confessing". Kelly responded, "That question makes no sense, no offense, but what I'm saying is this: 'I Admit' was me expressing my feelings about the things I was going through. If you're listening to it, you can hear exactly what I'm admitting."

Lyrics 

In "I Admit", Kelly admits to various acts, including dropping out of high school and not attending church. Kelly claims to be dyslexic, and asserts that his inability to read his recording contract caused him to forfeit publishing rights to his music, which contributed to Kelly's financial troubles, including his $20million tax debt to the Internal Revenue Service. In the song, Kelly confesses that he was sexually unfaithful and frequented strip clubs. Kelly reveals that he lost his virginity in his childhood when he was raped by an older female family member, elaborating on the disclosures from his 2012 autobiography, Soulacoaster: The Diary of Me.

Despite the song's title and Kelly's repetition of the lyric "I admit it, I did it" in the chorus, "I Admit" does not contain any criminal admissions. Kelly denies accusations of domestic violence, involvement in a "sex cult", and pedophilia in his lyrics, dismissing them as matters of opinion. Kelly does not admit guilt regarding the 2008 acquittal of his sex tape allegations, but maintains that he has been "falsely accused" and sings that his lawyer advised him to "don't say noth'". Although Kelly admits to casual sex with "both older and young ladies", he states that all of them were "over age". The lyrics denounce DeRogatis for profiting from his reports of Kelly's scandals, and John Legend, Steve Harvey, and Tom Joyner for refusing to publicly defend Kelly from his accusers.

In response to the Mute R. Kelly campaign, Kelly sings, "only God can mute me". Kelly expresses support for a "women's group", but also exclaims that "they tryna lock me up like Bill", referring to Bill Cosby, who at the time was awaiting incarceration after his April 2018 sexual assault convictions. Kelly finishes the song by telling the audience to "stay the fuck out of my business", and inviting his hometown of Chicago to use his image as inspiration for city youth.

Critical reception 

Several reviewers characterized "I Admit" as an act of trolling, since the name of the song overstates the magnitude of the admissions contained within the lyrics. Elyse Wanshel of HuffPost noted similarities between this song and If I Did It, a book by O. J. Simpson that contains a hypothetical description of the alleged murder in Simpson's murder case. Writing for The Daily Beast, Stereo Williams described the song as "20 minutes of defensive rambling and R. Kelly nailing himself to a cross". Williams asserted that Kelly "paints himself as the victim: the victim of the media, of sycophants, of his childhood abuser, of his own illiteracy" while "baiting his critics with a number of shockingly brazen lyrical references to his behavior".

In a review for The Atlantic, Hannah Giorgis compared the song's structure to Kelly's rap opera Trapped in the Closet, and remarked, "The specter of harmful actions is softened by the harmonies of the lullaby." Giorgis described Kelly's delivery as "a stomach-churning mix of self-pity and hubris" and criticized Kelly for refusing to address the alleged victims directly. She noted that "at no point does he speak to—rather than at or about—the women who have come forward" and wrote, "none of the women who have recounted tales of Kelly's abuse is worthy of being the hero in this story. Kelly, and Kelly alone, occupies that mantle."

Ann-Derrick Gaillot of The Outline considered "I Admit" a "bad song" and "a 20-minute long plea to save his dying career", and stated that the release of the song demonstrated that Kelly was "no longer invincible". In Rolling Stone, Michael Arcenaux lambasted Kelly for attempting to "invoke his own trauma to excuse the grief he is alleged to have caused in so many women and girls". Broadlys Leila Ettachfini labeled the song as "a bizarre attempt to garner some sympathy from the public in hopes that it could somehow absolve Kelly for his alleged crimes against women and girls", but remarked that "the song doesn't seem to be achieving Kelly's desired effect".

Responses 

In interviews with Variety and Billboard, DeRogatis denied that his reporting of Kelly's allegations had been a significant factor in his own career growth. DeRogatis defended his continued coverage of Kelly by disclosing that he still received calls from sources. He said, "You're not a journalist or a human being if you get those calls and do not do your job." Regarding the song's composition, DeRogatis saw "I Admit" as a continuation of Kelly's 10-minute remix of "I Believe I Can Fly" from his unreleased album Loveland, in which Kelly sings a plea to Saint Peter at the gates of heaven.

Andrea Kelly, R. Kelly's ex-wife, shared lyrics to her remix titled "Admit It" on Instagram on July 24, 2018. In her remix, Andrea alleges that R. Kelly physically abused her and neglected their children. In response to a lyric on "I Admit" where R. Kelly describes his relationship with his deceased mother, Joanne Kelly, Andrea sings that Joanne would disapprove of his actions. Andrea also accuses R. Kelly of being a "dead beat dad" and urges him to obtain "professional help".

R. Kelly's brother, Carey Killa Kelly, released a diss track named "I Confess" on YouTube on August 3, 2018. Replying to R. Kelly's claim on "I Admit" that Carey abandoned him, Carey echoes an April 2018 sexual misconduct allegation in which a woman accused R. Kelly of intentionally giving her a sexually transmitted infection. In "I Confess", Carey also implies that R. Kelly had sex with other men.

Black Twitter responded negatively to "I Admit", with many users expressing disgust at the song's lyrical content. The song was poorly received by other artists; Talib Kweli remarked that Kelly's "lack of self awareness is atrocious" and Questlove tweeted, "#IAdmit I want my 19 mins back". The co-founder of the Mute R. Kelly social media campaign, Oronike Odeleye, called the song a "19-minute sex trafficking fundraising anthem" and interpreted its release as an indicator of Mute R. Kelly's success. In an interview with the Associated Press, Odeleye reaffirmed the campaign's efforts to eliminate Kelly's remaining concert dates.

Rape, Abuse & Incest National Network spokeswoman Jodi Omear criticized the song's lyrics and stated, "Laws aren't opinions". An attorney representing the family of Joycelyn Savage, one of the daughters mentioned in DeRogatis's BuzzFeed News article, rebuked Kelly for trying to "shift the narrative" and demanded Savage's release.

Kelly was convicted of nine criminal counts, including racketeering (involving sexual exploitation of a child, kidnapping, bribery, and sex trafficking) and violations of the Mann Act, on September 28, 2021. A few fans of Kelly played "I Admit" beside the courthouse shortly after the judgment was issued.

See also 
 Harvey Weinstein sexual abuse allegations
 Me Too movement

References 

2018 songs
Works about cults
Obscenity controversies in music
R. Kelly songs
Songs about casual sex
Songs about domestic violence
Songs about sexual assault
Songs based on actual events
Songs written by R. Kelly
Song recordings produced by R. Kelly